, better known in Japan by his posthumous name, Jikaku Daishi, was a priest of the Tendai school of Buddhism in Japan, and its third .  Ennin was instrumental in expanding the Tendai Order's influence, and bringing back crucial training and resources from China, particularly esoteric Buddhist training and Pure Land teachings.

Birth and origin 

He was born into the Mibu family in present-day Tochigi Prefecture, Japan and entered the Buddhist priesthood at Enryaku-ji on Mt. Hiei (Hieizan) near Kyoto at the age of 14.

Trip to China 
In 838, Ennin was in the party which accompanied Fujiwara no Tsunetsugu's diplomatic mission to the Tang dynasty Imperial court.  The trip to China marked the beginning of a set of tribulations and adventures which he documented in his journal. The journal describes an account of the workings of the government of China, which saw strong and able administrative control of the state and its provinces, even at a time of a supposed decline of the Tang dynasty. His writings also expanded on religious matters and commerce. He stayed in Xi'an for five years.

Initially, he studied under two masters and then spent some time at Wutaishan (Japanese: Godaisan), a mountain range famous for its numerous Buddhist temples in Shanxi Province in China. Here, he learned  among other practices. Later he went to Chang'an (Japanese: Chōan), then the capital of China, where he was ordained into both mandala rituals: the Mahāvairocana-sūtra and the Vajraśekhara-sūtra, along with initiation and training in the Susiddhikara Sūtra tantra.  He also wrote of his travels by ship while sailing along the Grand Canal of China.

Ennin was in China when the anti-Buddhist Emperor Wuzong of Tang took the throne in 840, and he lived through the Great Anti-Buddhist Persecution of 842–846.  As a result of the persecution, he was deported from China, returning to Japan in 847.

Return to Japan 
In 847 he returned to Japan and in 854, he became the third abbot of the Tendai sect at Enryakuji, where he built buildings to store the sutras and religious instruments he brought back from China. His dedication to expanding the monastic complex and its courses of study assured the Tendai school a unique prominence in Japan. While his chief contribution was to strengthen the Tendai tantric Buddhist tradition, the Pure Land recitation practices (nenbutsu) that he introduced also helped to lay a foundation for the independent Pure Land movements of the subsequent Kamakura period (1185–1333). Ennin also founded the temple of Ryushakuji at Yamadera.

Literary work 
He wrote more than one hundred books. His diary of travels in China, was translated into English by Professor Edwin O. Reischauer under the title Ennin's Diary: The Record of a Pilgrimage to China in Search of the Law.  Sometimes ranked among the best travelogues in world literature, it is a key source of information on life in Tang China and Silla Korea and offers a rare glimpse of the Silla personality Jang Bogo.

References

Sources 
 Edwin O. Reischauer, Ennin's Diary: The Record of a Pilgrimage to China in Search of the Law (New York: Ronald Press, 1955).
 Edwin O. Reischauer, Ennin's Travels in T'ang China (New York: Ronald Press, 1955).

External links 
Retracing the steps of Ennin, a travelog of a partial retracing of Ennin's journey made in 2006, with photographs.

790s births
864 deaths
Japanese scholars of Buddhism
Japanese Buddhist clergy
Tendai Buddhist monks
People of Heian-period Japan
People of Nara-period Japan
Japanese ambassadors to the Tang dynasty
Heian period Buddhist clergy